Operation Telic was the codename for British operations in Iraq, which lasted from 19 March 2003 to 22 May 2011. During the campaign, 179 British service personnel and at least three UK Government civilian staff died (six of them female).

Many more were wounded. Of the more than 183 fatalities, 138 personnel were classified as having been killed in hostile circumstances, with the remaining 44 losing their lives as a result of illness, accidents/friendly fire, or suicide. The first casualties were sustained on 21 March 2003, with the bloodiest single day of the campaign being 30 January 2005 when a Royal Air Force Lockheed C-130 Hercules transport aircraft was shot down between Baghdad and Balad, killing all 10 servicemen on board. Steven Roberts (2nd Royal Tank Regiment) is recorded as the first soldier killed in the operation (albeit by friendly fire); two Royal Engineers were killed the previous day by a hostile crowd. Full non-fatal casualty records are currently only available for the period after 1 January 2006. From that date until the end of operations, 3,598 British personnel were wounded, injured or fell ill (315 wounded in action), 1,971 of whom required aeromedical evacuation.

British dead (by service)

Royal Navy
 Royal Navy – 8

Total: 8

Royal Marines
 Royal Marines – 11

Total: 11

British Army
 Household Cavalry Regiment – 3
 Royal Armoured Corps
 1st Queen's Dragoon Guards – 2
 Royal Scots Dragoon Guards – 2
 9th/12th Royal Lancers – 1
 King's Royal Hussars – 1
 Queen's Royal Lancers – 5
 Royal Tank Regiment – 3
 Royal Regiment of Artillery – 8
 Corps of Royal Engineers – 4
 Royal Corps of Signals – 5
 The Infantry
 Guards Division
 Coldstream Guards – 2
 Scots Guards – 1
 Irish Guards – 4
 Scottish Division
 Royal Highland Fusiliers – 1
 Black Watch – 7
 The Highlanders – 1
 Argyll and Sutherland Highlanders – 1
 52nd Lowland Regiment – 2
 Royal Regiment of Scotland – 2
 Queen's Division
 Princess of Wales's Royal Regiment – 3
 Royal Regiment of Fusiliers – 4
 Royal Anglian Regiment – 2
 King's Division
 Duke of Lancaster's Regiment – 7
 Queen's Lancashire Regiment – 1
 Yorkshire Regiment – 1
 Tyne-Tees Regiment – 1
 Prince of Wales' Division
 Staffordshire Regiment – 4
 Royal Welch Fusiliers – 1
 Royal Regiment of Wales – 1
 Royal Welsh – 3
 Light Division
 Devonshire and Dorset Light Infantry – 1
 Light Infantry – 3
 Royal Green Jackets – 1
 The Rifles – 8
 Parachute Regiment – 3
 Special Air Service – 8
 Army Air Corps – 2
 Royal Logistic Corps – 5
 Royal Army Medical Corps – 3
 Corps of Royal Electrical and Mechanical Engineers – 5
 Adjutant General's Corps
 Royal Military Police – 12
 Intelligence Corps – 3

Total: 137

Royal Air Force
 RAF Strike Command – 1
 RAF Benson – 2
 No. 33 Squadron RAF (Puma HC.1) – 1
 RAF Lyneham – 3
 No. 47 Squadron RAF (Hercules C.1/C.3) – 5
 RAF Marham
 No. IX (B) Squadron (Tornado GR.4) – 2
 RAF Aldergrove
 No. 230 Squadron RAF (Puma HC.1) – 1
 RAF Brize Norton – 1
 RAF Regiment
 1 Squadron – 3
 16 Squadron – 1
 504 Squadron RAuxAF – 1
 Royal Air Force Police – 1

Total: 22

UK government civilian personnel
 Ministry of Defence Fire Service – 1
 Department of Health and Social Care – 1
 Foreign and Commonwealth Office (contractor) – 2

Total: 4

British dead (rank – name – age – unit – incident – date)
(NB: IED = improvised explosive device. RTA = road traffic accident. Non-hostile = friendly fire.)

2003
Combat fatalities: 40, other fatalities: 13, wounded in action: n/a, other injured: n/a.

2004
Combat fatalities: 10, other fatalities: 12, wounded in action: n/a, Other Injured: n/a.

2005
Combat fatalities: 20, other fatalities: 3, wounded in action: n/a, other injured: n/a.

2006
Combat fatalities: 27, other fatalities: 2, wounded in action: 93, other injured: 1209.

2007
Combat fatalities: 37, other fatalities: 10, wounded in action: 202, other injured: 1098.

2008
Combat fatalities: 2, other fatalities: 2, wounded in action: 20, other injured: 758.

2009
Combat fatalities: 0, other fatalities: 1, wounded in action: 0, other injured: 218.

Notes

References

External links
 "UK military deaths in Iraq", BBC News, 7 July 2016

Iraq War casualties
20th-century military history of the United Kingdom